Barbora Klementová (born 11 October 1994) is a Slovak cross-country skier. She competed in the women's sprint at the 2018 Winter Olympics.

Cross-country skiing results
All results are sourced from the International Ski Federation (FIS).

Olympic Games

World Championships

World Cup

Season standings

References

External links
 

1994 births
Living people
Slovak female cross-country skiers
Olympic cross-country skiers of Slovakia
Cross-country skiers at the 2018 Winter Olympics
Cross-country skiers at the 2022 Winter Olympics
People from Levoča
Sportspeople from the Prešov Region
Cross-country skiers at the 2012 Winter Youth Olympics